Marianne Haslum (born 31 January 1974 in Lillehammer, Norway) is a Norwegian curler.

At major championships, she won bronze medals in 1993, 1995, 1996, 2000 and 2002, and silver in 1997 and 2004. She has so far, however, failed in her quest to win an Olympic medal for Norway, finishing fifth in the Nagano Olympics in 1998, seventh in the Salt Lake City Olympics in 2002, and fourth in the Torino Olympics in 2006.

Team mates
Dordi Nordby (skip)
Marianne Rørvik (second)
Camilla Holth (lead) 
Charlotte Hovring (alternate)

References

External links
 

Norwegian female curlers
Curlers at the 2006 Winter Olympics
1974 births
Living people
Curlers at the 1998 Winter Olympics
Curlers at the 2002 Winter Olympics
Olympic curlers of Norway
Continental Cup of Curling participants
Sportspeople from Lillehammer